Philip Charles Harris, Baron Harris of Peckham (born 15 September 1942), is an English businessman and politician. A prominent Conservative Party donor, Harris is a member of the House of Lords.

He is the sponsor of a large multi-academy trust, the Harris Federation.

Interests

Business

Harris is currently an advisor and shareholder of Tapi Carpets, a flooring retailer set up recently by a number of the old Carpetright management team. Harris was the Chairman of Carpetright plc and has over fifty years' experience in carpet retailing. Harris left Carpetright in 2014, sold all of his shares and he is no longer associated with the company.

He was chairman and chief executive of Harris Carpets. Harris Carpets acquired Queensway in 1977 to become Harris Queensway plc until the company was taken over in 1988.

Harris was also a non-executive director of Great Universal Stores plc for 18 years, retiring from the GUS Board in July 2004. Harris became a non-executive director of Matalan in October 2004.

Football
He was appointed to the board of Arsenal Football Club as a non-executive director in November 2005.

Equestrian interests
Harris is the co-owner of the horse Hello Sanctos, which won a gold medal with Scott Brash in the team show jumping event at the London 2012 Summer Olympics.

Harris and Lord Kirkham bought the horse for an estimated €2 million at the start of 2012.
They are also co-owners of the horses Hello Sailor, Hello Unique and Hello Boyo.

Politics

Conservative Party donations

Harris has been a donor to the Tory Party since the 1980s and was a great admirer of Margaret Thatcher. He also made donations to David Cameron as leader of the Conservative Party and Michael Gove.

Comments on Theresa May
In a September 2017 interview with The Times he described Theresa May as very indecisive, hopeless during the general election campaign which she should have won easily, and leading a weak, directionless government.
Other comments made included his opposition to an expansion of grammar schools, May u-turning on too many decisions such as the so-called dementia tax, and the Home Office not reducing net migration to the tens of thousands as repeatedly promised. Harris spoke about potential candidates on who could succeed May as Conservative Party Leader.

Harris Federation academies

He has contributed extensively to education and as a result, many schools and colleges (such as Harris Manchester College, Oxford) bear his name.  Through the Harris Federation, many secondary schools in South London have received Harris donations.  In the London Borough of Croydon, he helped to found the Harris City Technology College, Harris Academy South Norwood and Harris Academy Merton, Harris Academy Purley, Harris Academy Chafford Hundred, Harris Academy Peckham although many local residents are angered that the original name of the Harris Girls' Academy East Dulwich, Stanley Technical High School, was dropped in place of the Harris name.

In recent years, the forced change to academy status has placed additional schools under the management of the Harris Federation despite considerable opposition from Boards of Governors and parents.

Personal life

Sunday Times Rich List

Harris ranked 206th in the Sunday Times Rich List 2006, with an estimated wealth of £285m.

Honours
Harris was knighted in 1985. He was made a life peer as Baron Harris of Peckham, in the London Borough of Southwark on 11 January 1996.

His wife, Lady Pauline, was created a Dame Commander of the Order of the British Empire (DBE) in 2004.

References

Harris of Peckham
British businesspeople
Arsenal F.C. directors and chairmen
Fellows of King's College London
Knights Bachelor
1942 births
Living people
Conservative Party (UK) donors
People associated with Harris Manchester College, Oxford
Life peers created by Elizabeth II